Weng Zuze (born January 1941) is a Chinese electrical engineer and academic. He served as president of Hunan University from December 1987 to July 1993. He is a member of the Jiusan Society.

Biography
Weng was born and raised in Shanghai. In 1964 he graduated from Harbin Institute of Technology, where he majored in electrical engineering. Weng joined the chemical engineering faculty of Hunan University in 1978 and was promoted to professor in June 1988. He was a visiting scholar at the University of British Columbia from January 1980 to 1982.

He served as vice-president of Hunan University from December 1985 to December 1987 and the university's president from December 1987 to July 1993.

In December 1989, he joined the Jiusan Society.

References

1941 births
Educators from Shanghai
Living people
Nanyang Model High School alumni
Harbin Institute of Technology alumni
Academic staff of Hunan University
Presidents of Hunan University
Members of the Jiusan Society
Chinese electrical engineers
Engineers from Shanghai